Gnophaela clappiana is a moth of the family Erebidae. It was described by William Jacob Holland in 1891. It is found in the United States from Arizona and New Mexico to Colorado.

References

 

Gnophaela
Moths described in 1891